Zaru Sara (also Romanized as Zarū Sarā; also known as Zarūd Sarā) is a village in Jennat Rudbar Rural District, in the Central District of Ramsar County, Mazandaran Province, Iran. At the 2006 census, its population was 15, in 7 families.

References 

Populated places in Ramsar County